The Pietra di Bismantova (literally Stone of Bismantova) is a geological formation (monadnock or inselberg) in the Reggiano Apennines, in the comune of Castelnovo ne' Monti, province of Reggio Emilia, Northern Italy, c.  from Reggio Emilia. It has the shape of a narrow, quasi-cylindrical plateau (measuring 1 km x 240 m) whose steep walls emerge  as an isolated spur from the nearby hills. It is included in the National Park of the Appennino Tosco-Emiliano.

The spur is composed of yellowish calcarenite over a marl basement, all formed in the Miocene as a sea bottom. It includes fossils belonging to a tropical environment. It is surrounded by woods, mostly of hazel trees (Corylus avellana).

The Pietra di Bismantova is mentioned by Dante Alighieri in his Divine Comedy (Purgatory, IV, 25-30).

See also
Inselberg

References

External links
Page at Emilia-Romagna region nature website 

Mountains of Emilia-Romagna
Mountains of the Apennines
Inselbergs of Europe